New Hampshire's 2nd congressional district covers the western, northern, and some southern parts of New Hampshire. It includes the state's second-largest city, Nashua, as well as the state capital, Concord. It is currently represented in the United States House of Representatives by Democrat Ann McLane Kuster.

Although the district appears rural, it is classified by the Census Bureau as a majority-urban district, since a large share of the district's population lies within more densely populated areas in Hillsborough, Rockingham, and Merrimack counties. The district is home to the Dartmouth College, the state's 2nd largest college. Some of the largest employers in the district are Dartmouth Hitchcock, Dartmouth College, Southern New Hampshire Health System, and BAE Systems.

History and composition
The district (2022-) includes:

 the town of Center Harbor in Belknap County
 the towns of Jackson, Sandwich and Madison in Carroll County
 all of Cheshire County
 all of Coos County
 all of Grafton County, except the town of Campton
 all of Hillsborough County, except the communities of Bedford, Goffstown, Manchester, and Merrimack
 all of Merrimack County, except the town of Hooksett
 the towns of Atkinson, Deerfield, Northwood, Salem, and Windham in Rockingham County
all of Sullivan County

Until 1847, New Hampshire's representatives were elected at large, from the entire state, and not from districts. Districts began being used in the 1846 elections. Until the 1878 elections, New Hampshire elected its members of the United States House of Representatives in March of the odd-numbered years. That would be too late for the beginning of the March 4 term, but the first session of the House typically didn't start until December; so, a March election wasn't a problem. The district currently includes Dartmouth College, and all of its representatives since 1995 (Bass, Hodes, and Kuster) have been Dartmouth alumni.

Historically, the second district has had strong Republican leanings, having voted Republican 71 times and Democrat only 15. The district has leaned Democratic in congressional races since 2006, and in presidential races since 2000.

Recent statewide election results

List of members representing the district

Electoral history

2012

2014

2016

2018

2020

2022

Historical district boundaries

See also

New Hampshire's 1st congressional district
New Hampshire's congressional districts
List of United States congressional districts

References

Further reading

 Congressional Biographical Directory of the United States 1774–present

02
Belknap County, New Hampshire
Cheshire County, New Hampshire
Coös County, New Hampshire
Grafton County, New Hampshire
Hillsborough County, New Hampshire
Merrimack County, New Hampshire
Rockingham County, New Hampshire
Sullivan County, New Hampshire